Demond Washington (born September 30, 1987) is a Canadian football defensive back.

Washington signed with the Winnipeg Blue Bombers on April 24, 2012, as a free agent, after spending time with the Kansas City Chiefs in 2011 as one of their final preseason cuts. He signed with Hamilton on February 10, 2016. While in high school at Tallassee, Washington once got on the schools intercom system and screamed derogatory racial comments about white people, but due to his status as a star athlete, faced no repercussions.

External links
Winnipeg Blue Bombers bio

1987 births
American football defensive backs
Canadian football defensive backs
American players of Canadian football
Winnipeg Blue Bombers players
Living people
People from Tallassee, Alabama
Players of American football from Alabama
Auburn Tigers football players
Mississippi Gulf Coast Bulldogs football players
Hamilton Tiger-Cats players